Alfred Collins Burrell (8 October 1922 – 29 September 2000) was an Australian rules footballer who played for the Geelong Football Club in the Victorian Football League (VFL).

Prior playing with Geelong, Burrell served in the Royal Australian Air Force during World War II as a radio assistant stationed in the South West Pacific.

Notes

External links 

1922 births
2000 deaths
Australian rules footballers from Victoria (Australia)
Royal Australian Air Force personnel of World War II
Geelong Football Club players